Horsepower is a unit of measurement of power.

Horse power may also refer to:

 Horse power (machine) or horse engine, a machine powered by a horse
 Horse Power (song), a song by the Chemical Brothers
 HorsePower: The Museum of the King's Royal Hussars, a military museum in Winchester, Hampshire, England